The 2022 Weber State Wildcats football team represented Weber State University as a member of the Big Sky Conference during the 2022 NCAA Division I FCS football season. The Wildcats were led by ninth-year head coach Jay Hill and played their games at Stewart Stadium in Ogden, Utah. The Wildcats began the regular season ranked number 20 in the FCS rankings. On September 10, the Wildcats defeated the Utah State Aggies, their first win against the Aggies since 1978, and their first win against an FBS opponent since their victory against Nevada in 1993. The Wildcats finished the regular season with a record of 9–2, good enough to qualify for the NCAA Division I FCS Playoffs, their fifth appearance under Jay Hill. The Wildcats defeated North Dakota in the opening round, but were defeated by Montana State the following round. After the season, head coach Jay Hill announced he would step down as Weber State head coach to accept the Defensive Coordinator position at BYU. Offensive coordinator Mickey Mental was announced as Hill's successor.

Previous season

They finished the 2021 season 6–5, 5–3 in Big Sky play to finish in a tie for fifth place. Due to a tiebreaker loss to UC Davis they didn't receive an at-large bid to the FCS playoffs.

Preseason

Polls
On July 25, 2022, during the virtual Big Sky Kickoff, the Wildcats were predicted to finish fourth in the Big Sky by both the coaches and media.

Preseason All–Big Sky team
The Wildcats had one player selected to the preseason all-Big Sky team.

Offense

Noah Atagi – OL

Schedule

Game summaries

Western Oregon

at Utah State

Utah Tech

at UC Davis

No. 24 Eastern Washington

at Portland State

at No. 3 Montana State

No. 11 Montana

No. 2 Sacramento State

Idaho State

at Northern Arizona

FCS Playoffs

No. 20 North Dakota – First Round

at No. 3 Montana State – Second Round

References

Weber State
Weber State Wildcats football seasons
Weber State
Weber State Wildcats football